Shree Shivaji Education Society is the largest Educational society in Vidarbha. It was established by Dr.Panjabrao Deshmukh at Amravati. Now this society is one of the largest of its kind in India. This society has arts, commerce
and science colleges, a management college at Nagpur, an engineering college at Akola and a medical college at Amravati. It has a widespread network of school and colleges in Vidarbha.

The Shri Shivaji Education Society, Amravati is a premier educational institution of Central India with branches in all the districts of Vidarbha in Maharastra. It is registered as a Public Charitable Trust ( R.N. F/89). Its founder President was the late Dr. Panjabrao alias Bhausaheb Deshmukh who established various schools, colleges, hostels and other teaching and technical institutions and devoted all his energy for strengthening and enlarging the activities of the Shri Shivaji Education Society, Amravati.

The Society was registered in December 1932. In 1958, it had one primary school, seven middle schools and eight colleges. Today it runs 24 senior colleges 54 Jr. colleges, 75 middle schools, 35 hostels mainly in the region of Vidarbha but also in other parts of the state.

The educational institutions cover areas like agriculture, arts, bio-technology, computers, education, physical education, engineering, horticulture, information technology, law, medicine, micro-biology and the pure sciences. It also runs a Polytechnic for boys and girls at Amravati.

The Shivaji Education Society was founded by Dr. Panjabrao alias Bhausaheb Deshmukh in 1931 or 1932. Along with other members, Bhausaheb devoted himself to educate the people by establishing school and colleges far and wide in the Vidarbha. The Society was awarded the Dr. Babasaheb Ambedkar 'Dalit Mitra' Award in 1993-94 by the Government of Maharashtra. In the year 1999-2000 the Society was awarded the Gadge Maharaj Memorial Award. On 5 September 2000 Maharashtra declared it the "Best Administered Society" in the state and awarded it Rs. 1 lakh. In its citation, the state formally recognized the society's seminal contribution to the field of education and cultural advancement.

Missions 
 To build a network of school and colleges for educating the masses
 To undertake rural development programme for the upliftment of villages and the rural areas with such instruments like the rural development institutes and its like
 To establish farmers association for safeguarding their interests and for ventilating their grievances
 To disseminate the latest knowledge and technology in farming, so that the people of this region are always in the flow of the latest currents worldwide
 To open Shri Shivaji Loka Vidyapeeth to speed up the programme of cultural renaissance and advancement of knowledge
 To undertake exclusive programme for caste eradication, social reformation and freedom from debt of the farmers and peasants

Education in Amravati
Educational organisations in Maharashtra
Monuments and memorials to Shivaji
1932 establishments in India